An Olympic medal is awarded to successful competitors at one of the Olympic Games. There are three classes of medal to be won: gold, silver, and bronze, awarded to first, second, and third place, respectively. The granting of awards is laid out in detail in the Olympic protocols.

Medal designs have varied considerably since the Games in 1896, particularly in the size of the medals for the Summer Olympic Games. The design selected for the 1928 Games remained for many years, until its replacement at the 2004 Games in Athens as the result of controversy surrounding the use of the Roman Colosseum rather than a building representing Greek roots. The medals of the Winter Olympic Games never had a common design, but regularly feature snowflakes and the event where the medal has been won.

In addition to generally supporting their Olympic athletes, some countries provide sums of money and gifts to medal winners, depending on the classes and number of medals won.

Introduction and early history
The olive wreath was the prize for the winner at the Ancient Olympic Games. It was an olive branch, off the wild-olive tree that grew at Olympia, intertwined to form a circle or a horse-shoe. According to Pausanias, it was introduced by Heracles as a prize for the winner of the running race to honour Zeus.

When the modern Olympic Games began in 1896 medals started to be given to successful olympian competitors. However, gold medals were not awarded at the inaugural Olympics in 1896 in Athens, Greece. The winners were instead given a silver medal and an olive branch, while runners-up received a laurel branch and a copper or bronze medal. 

Gilt silver medals were awarded for 1st place in shooting, lifesaving, automobile racing and gymnastics. Whilst 2nd place silver medals were awarded in shooting, rowing, yachting, tennis, gymnastics, sabre, fencing, equestrian and athletics. With 3rd place bronze medals being awarded in gymnastics, firefighting and shooting. In many sports, however, medals were not awarded. With most of the listed prizes being cups and other trophies. 

The custom of the sequence of gold, silver, and bronze for the first three places in all events dates from the 1904 Summer Olympics in St. Louis, Missouri in the United States. The International Olympic Committee (IOC) has retroactively assigned gold, silver and bronze medals to the three best-placed athletes in each event of the 1896 and 1900 Games. If there is a tie for any of the top three places all competitors are entitled to receive the appropriate medal according to IOC rules. Some combat sports (such as boxing, judo, taekwondo and wrestling) award two bronze medals per competition, resulting in, overall, more bronze medals being awarded than the other colours.

Medals are not the only awards given to competitors; every athlete placed first to eighth receives an Olympic diploma. Also, at the main host stadium, the names of all medal winners are written onto a wall. Finally, as noted below, all athletes receive a participation medal and diploma.

Production and design

The IOC dictates the physical properties of the medals and has the final decision about the finished design. Specifications for the medals are developed along with the National Olympic Committee (NOC) hosting the Games, though the IOC has brought in some set rules:
Recipients: The top three competitors receive medals
Shape: Usually circular, featuring an attachment for a chain or ribbon
Diameter: A minimum of 60 mm
Thickness: A minimum of 3 mm
Material:
First place (the gold medal): It is composed at least 92.5% of silver, plated with 6 grams of gold; the metal value was about US$494 in 2010. At the 2020 Summer Olympics held in 2021 in Tokyo, Japan, the medal at current prices is worth about $800.
Second place (the silver medal): 92.5% silver; the metal value was about US$260 in 2010. At Tokyo, Japan, the medal is worth $460.
Third place (the bronze medal): In 2010 it was 97% copper with 0.5% tin and 2.5% zinc; the metal value was about US$3 in 2010. At the Tokyo games it was 95% copper and 5% zinc with a metal value of about $5.
Event details: The sport for which the medal has been awarded should be written on the medal.

The first Olympic medals in 1896 were designed by French sculptor Jules-Clément Chaplain and depicted Zeus holding Nike, the Greek goddess of victory, on the obverse and the Acropolis on the reverse. They were made by the Paris Mint, which also made the medals for the 1900 Olympic Games, hosted by Paris. This started the tradition of giving the responsibility of minting the medals to the host city. For the next few Olympiads, the host city also chose the medal design. Until 1912 the gold medals were made of solid gold.

Trionfo

In 1923 the International Olympic Committee (IOC) launched a competition for sculptors to design the medals for the Summer Olympic Games. Giuseppe Cassioli's Trionfo design was chosen as the winner in 1928. The obverse brought back Nike but this time as the main focus, holding a winner's crown and palm with a depiction of the Colosseum in the background. In the top right section of the medal, a space was left for the name of the Olympic host and the Games numeral. 

The reverse features a crowd of people carrying a triumphant athlete. His winning design was first presented at the 1928 Summer Olympics in Amsterdam. The medals for the 1960 Games in Rome inverted the design, with the obverse featuring the crowd and the reverse featuring Nike. The competition saw this design used for 40 years until the 1972 Summer Olympics in Munich became the first Games with a different design for the reverse side of the medal.

Cassioli's design continued to inspire the obverse of the medal for many more years, though recreated each time, with the Olympic host and numeral updated. The obverse remained true to the Trionfo design until the 1992 Summer Olympics in Barcelona, Spain, where the IOC allowed an updated version to be created. For the next few events , they mandated the use of the Nike motif but allowed other aspects to change.

The trend ended after 2000, due to the negative reaction to the medal design for the 2000 Summer Olympics in Sydney. The designer of the 2000 medal (Wojciech Pietranik) had originally featured the Sydney Opera House on the obverse instead of the traditional Roman Colosseum but the International Olympic Committee decided that the Colosseum should remain. The Greek press criticised the design for ignorance of the birthplace of the Olympic Games, pointing out that the long-standing feature on the front of medals was mistakenly depicting the Roman Colosseum rather than the Greek Parthenon. The Sydney Organising Committee decided to continue with the design as it was, noting that there was insufficient time to complete another version and that it would be too costly. After 76 years a new style by designer Elena Votsi depicting the Panathenaic Stadium was introduced at the 2004 Summer Olympics in Athens. This new obverse design remains in use.

Custom reverse designs
The German Olympic Committee, Nationales Olympisches Komitee für Deutschland, was the first Summer Games organisers to elect to change the reverse of the medal. The 1972 design was created by Gerhard Marcks, an artist from the Bauhaus, and features mythological twins Castor and Pollux. Since then the Organising Committee of the host city has been given the freedom of the design of the reverse, with the IOC giving final approval.

Comparison between Summer and Winter
The IOC has the final decision on the specifications of each design for all Olympic medals, including the Summer Games, Winter Games, and Paralympic Games. There has been a greater variety of design for the Winter Games; unlike with the Summer Games, the IOC never mandated one particular design. The medal at the inaugural 1924 Winter Olympics in Chamonix, France did not even feature the Olympic rings. Nike was featured on the medals of the 1932 and 1936 Games but has only appeared on one medal design since then. One regular motif is the use of the snowflake, while laurel leaves and crowns appear on several designs. The Olympic motto Citius, Altius, Fortius features on four Winter Games medals but does not appear on any Summer Games medal.

For three events in a row, hosts of the Winter Games included different materials in the medals: glass (1992), sparagmite (1994), and lacquer (1998). It was not until the 2008 Summer Olympics in Beijing, China that a Summer Olympic host chose to use something different, in this case, jade. While every Summer Olympic medal except for the 1900 Games has been circular, the shapes of the Winter Games have been considerably more varied. The Winter Games medals are also generally larger, thicker, and heavier than those for the Summer Games.

Individual design details

Summer Olympic medal designs
Details about the medals from each of the Summer Olympic Games:

Winter Olympic medal designs
Details about the medals from each of the Winter Olympic Games:

Participation medals

Since the beginning of the modern Olympics the athletes and their support staffs, event officials, and certain volunteers involved in planning and managing the games have received commemorative medals and diplomas. Like the winners' medals, these are changed for each Olympic Festival, with different ones issued for the summer and winter games.

Gallery

Presentation

The presentation of the medals and awards varied significantly until the 1932 Summer Olympics in Los Angeles brought in what has now become standard. Before 1932 all the medals were awarded at the closing ceremony, with the athletes wearing evening dress for the first few Games. Originally the presenting dignitary was stationary while the athletes filed past to receive their medals. The victory podium was introduced upon the personal instruction in 1931 of Henri de Baillet-Latour, who had seen one used at the 1930 British Empire Games. The winner is in the middle at a higher elevation, with the silver medallist to the right and the bronze to the left. At the 1932 Winter Olympics, medals were awarded in the closing ceremony, with athletes for each event in turn mounting the first-ever podium. At the Summer Olympics, competitors in the Coliseum received their medals immediately after each event for the first time; competitors at other venues came to the Coliseum the next day to receive their medals. Later Games have had a victory podium at each competition venue.

The 1960 Summer Olympics in Rome, Italy were the first in which the medals were placed around the neck of the athletes. The medals hung from a chain of laurel leaves, while they are now hung from a coloured ribbon. When Athens hosted the 2004 Summer Olympics the competitors on the podium also received an olive wreath crown. In the 2016 Summer Olympics in Rio de Janeiro, each medalist received a wooden statuette of the Olympic logo.

See also
 
 Summer Olympic coins
 Winter Olympic coins
 Lists of Olympic medalists
 James Brendan Connolly, recipient of the first winner's medal
 Pierre de Coubertin medal, a special medal awarded by the International Olympic Committee for sportsmanship or exceptional service to the Olympic movement

References

External links